Allegory of Justice is an oil on panel painting by Giorgio Vasari. The painting was commissioned on 6 January 1543 by cardinal Alessandro Farnese for the main room of the Palazzo della Cancelleria in Rome, and was executed the same year. It and the rest of the Farnese collection were later moved to Naples and it is now in the National Museum of Capodimonte.

References

1543 paintings
Farnese Collection
Paintings in the collection of the Museo di Capodimonte
16th-century allegorical paintings
Allegorical paintings by Italian artists
Paintings by Giorgio Vasari